The University of North Carolina at Charlotte Pride of Niner Nation Marching Band, also known as The Pride of Niner Nation, and PNNMB is the official marching band for the University of North Carolina at Charlotte. They perform at every Charlotte 49ers home football game at Jerry Richardson Stadium and also at various other events such as away football games, pep rallies, parades, and special observances. A partial band usually travels to at least one away game a year. The band includes the Colorguard and Batton Twirler. Members of the PNNMB also participate in Wind Ensemble, the Symphonic Band, and the 49ers Basketball Band.

History
The first marching band at the University of North Carolina at Charlotte was founded in 2015. With the restart of UNC Charlotte's football program in 2013, the university had no immediate plans to start a marching band. Alumnus and former UNC Charlotte Board of Trustees chairman Gene Johnson and his wife Vickie, also an alum, helped to organize several donations for the purchase of equipment and staff for a twenty-five-person drumline, with corresponding scholarships for the drummers. The drumline debuted with the team in 2013. The positive response to these efforts encouraged the university to develop a plan to debut a full marching band for the 2015 season. This included raising $2,000,000 for construction of a permanent home for the band and $4,500,000 to endow scholarships for band members.

In fall 2014 Dr. Jeff Miller was hired as the first Director of Athletic Bands and, under UNC Charlotte Director of Bands Dr. Shawn Smith, began recruiting the inaugural band class. With an additional gift of $2,000,000 from the Johnsons ground was broken on the Vickie and Gene Johnson Marching Band Center. The members of the drumline and the pre-existing Basketball Pep Band, who would soon merge into the larger marching band, chose the name Pride of Niner Nation Marching Band for the new entity.

The Pride of Niner Nation Marching Band debuted in the 2015 football season alongside the 49ers' move up to FBS level and the inaugural season of C-USA play.

Director of Athletic Bands
 1st Director: Dr. Jeff Miller, DMA  (2014–2018)
 2nd Director: Dr. Joseph Schievert, DMA (2018 - 2019)
 3rd Director: Dr. Shayna Stahl, DMA  (2019–2021)
 4th Director: Mr. Daniel Fischer, MA (2021-current)

2018 D-Day anniversary
The Pride of Niner Nation Marching Band was invited and accepted to perform in Normandy for the 2018 D-Day anniversary observance. The band was invited in their second year of existence in 2016.PNNMB in Normandy

Tradition

Forty Niners Fight song
Music for the fight song was first composed by music faculty member Dr. Harry Bulow in 2001 to replace the original fight song used since the 1960s, University of Texas's "Texas Fight", without lyrics. Lyrics were subsequently added to the new tune in 2006 by then University Directory of Bands Dr. Lawrence Marks.
PNNMB Playing Charlotte 49er Fight Song

Lyrics

Hail, Charlotte 49ers, proud as we can be
We stand to fight for the green and white,
Til we win the Victory (Go Niners!)
We pledge our trust in you,
And wave your colors high
The loyal Niner Nation cheers,
Forever! We'll Fight-Fight-Fight!

Pregame

Niner Walk
Starting from the Inaugural football season drumline in 2013, the PNNMB has carried on the tradition of leading the Charlotte 49ers football team pre-game Niner Walk.Niner Walk and Team Intro

Pregame Show
The band begins the show by marching out from the Rose Football Center to midfield to Niner Fanfare, then forming into the number "49" to play the Charlotte 49ers Fight Song, Let's Go Niners, and the UNC Charlotte Alma Mater. Then the band reforms into a star formation for An American Celebration, and the national anthem. This is followed by that year's specific pregame music and formations before marching off back to the Rose Football Center to Glory Niners.PNNMB Pregame Show

Traditional before and in-game music includes the following:

Niner Fanfare — Thurston
Charlotte 49ers Fight Song — Bulow/Campbell/Miller
Let's Go Niners Cheer — Traditional
UNC Charlotte Alma Mater — Sutcliffe/Rieke/Haldeman/Miller
Star-Spangled Banner — Key/Fillmore
49ers Musical Cheer — Thurston
Glory 49ers — Traditional/Miller

In the Stands
The PNNMB play during in-game action breaks from the top of section 122 of Jerry Richardson Stadium.

Halftime Show
The team marches across the field from the away side and form various formations while playing that year's musical selections. The halftime show has included musical genres featuring Latin, Rock-n-roll, Symphonic Classics, and Patriotic fare. It has also featured the music of Michael Jackson, Queen, Elton John, Star Wars, and 90's Classics.2019 PNNMB - Show 1 - The 90s

End of the Game
The Charlotte 49ers Fight Song and Alma Mater are played after the conclusion of the game.Post-game Alma Mater

See also
UNC Charlotte
Charlotte 49ers

References

University of North Carolina at Charlotte
Conference USA marching bands
2015 establishments in North Carolina
Musical groups established in 2015